Jack Brown or Browne may refer to:

John Alf Brown (1881–1936), known as Jack Brown, Welsh rugby player
Jack Brown (Australian footballer) (1886–1950), Australian rules footballer for St Kilda
Jack Brown (cricketer) (1869–1904), English cricketer
Jack Brown (footballer, born 1899) (1899–1962), English football goalkeeper
Jack Brown (footballer, born 2001), Scottish footballer
Jack Brown (rower) (born 1922), English rower
Jack Brown (rugby league) (born 2000), English rugby league player
Jack Brown (trade unionist) (1929–1991), British trade union leader
Jack Browne, Baron Craigton (1904–1993), Scottish Tory politician
Jack Brown Genius, a New Zealand romantic fantasy film

See also
Jackie Brown (disambiguation)
John Brown (disambiguation)